Kingsborough Community College (KBCC) is a public community college in Brooklyn, New York. It is part of the City University of New York (CUNY) system and the only community college in Brooklyn.

History
Kingsborough was founded in 1963, and serves approximately 10,000 students. In its early years, it also had an annex, known as the "Mid-Brooklyn campus". In 2019 Leonard Riggio, the founder and chairman of Barnes & Noble book stores, donated $1 million toward scholarships for Kingsborough students.

It was recognized in April 2019 as one of the top 10 community colleges in the United States by the Aspen Institute, an educational and policy think tank.

Campus

Located in Manhattan Beach, the  campus overlooks Sheepshead Bay, Jamaica Bay, and the Atlantic Ocean. It is also located on the site of the old Sheepshead Bay Maritime Training Center for Merchant Marines, Coast Guard and Navy and the Manhattan Beach Air Force Station. The library at Kingsborough Community College is named after former City University of New York Chancellor Robert Kibbee. The 743-seat Leon M. Goldstein Performing Arts Center at Kingsborough was named in honor of Leon M. Goldstein, who was President at the college from 1971 to 1999. Kingsborough is the only college in New York City with its own private beach, which is open for swimming during the summer.

Athletics

Kingsborough Community College teams participate as a member of the National Junior College Athletic Association (NJCAA). The Wave is a member of the community college section of the City University of New York Athletic Conference (CUNYAC). Men's sports include baseball, basketball, tennis, and track & field; while women's sports include basketball, tennis, track & field, and volleyball.

Notable alumni

 Riddick Bowe (born 1967), world champion heavyweight boxer
 Eric Carr (1950–1991), multi-instrumentalist and musician
 Mauriel Carty (born 1997), Anguillan sprinter
 Andrew Dice Clay (born Andrew Clay Silverstein; 1957), standup comedian and actor
 Tashni-Ann Dubroy (née Coote; born c. 1981), Jamaican academic and university administrator, president of Shaw University
 Pete Falcone (born 1953), New York Mets major league pitcher
 Jeff Koinange (born 1966), former CNN Africa correspondent
 Phillipe Nover (born 1984), TUF 8 finalist and UFC fighter
 Rey Palacios (born 1962), Kansas City Royals Major League baseball catcher
 Barbara Patton (born 1944), lawyer and politician
 Sid Rosenberg (born 1967), radio personality
 Larry Seabrook, former New York City Councilman
 Aesha Waks, actress
 Andrew D. Weyman, television director and producer

Notable faculty
 Katasha Artis (born 1973), basketball player and coach
 Edward H. Bersoff, president, CEO & founder of BTG, Inc.
 Stanley G. Cohen, president of Five Towns College
 Eleanor Cory (born 1943), composer
 Craig Drennen (born 1966), artist
 Paul Goldberg, geologist
 Leon M. Goldstein (died 1999), President of Kingsborough Community College, and acting Chancellor of the City University of New York
 Victor Gorelick (1941-2020), comic book editor and executive
 Dan Grimaldi (born 1952), actor on the HBO TV series The Sopranos
 Seymour P. Lachman (born 1933), professor, political historian, book author, and politician
 Ronny Lee (born Ronald Leventhal; 1927–2015), guitarist and author of music instruction publications
 Ursula Mamlok (born Ursula Meyer; 1923–2016), composer
 David Maslanka (1943–2017), composer
 Fred Mitchell (1923–2013), New York School Abstract Expressionist artist
 Regina Peruggi (born c. 1947), President of Kingsborough Community College
Abram Schlemowitz (1910–1998), sculptor
 Frederic Matys Thursz (1930–1992), abstract painter
 Calvin Edouard Ward (1925-2018), concert pianist, music theorist, and educator

References

External links

 

Colleges of the City University of New York
Educational institutions established in 1963
Manhattan Beach, Brooklyn
Two-year colleges in the United States
Universities and colleges in Brooklyn
Community colleges in New York City
1963 establishments in New York City
NJCAA athletics